Mbhashe River is one of the major rivers in the Eastern Cape Province, South Africa. It flows in a southeastern direction and has a catchment area of 6,030 km.  The river drains into the Indian Ocean through an estuary located near the lighthouse at Bashee, south of Mhlanganisweni.

After passing under national road N2, the Mbhashe River  encounters southwest of Elliotdale and north-east of Dutywa the more rugged terrain of the Wild Coast and suddenly enters into a 64 km long series of violent twists and turns known as the Collywobbles before continuing more sedately towards the Indian Ocean.

The Mbhashe river's main tributaries are the Xuka River, Mgwali River, Dutywa River and the Mnyolo River. Presently this river is part of the Mzimvubu to Keiskamma Water Management Area.

History 

In 1554 Portuguese ship São Bento ran aground at the mouth of the Mbhashe River. The ordeal of 322 of its survivors, who walked from there to Lourenço Marques, presently Maputo, has been recorded.

Mvezo is a village on the banks of the Mbhashe River, where Nelson Mandela was born in 1918.

Ecology 

Some of the fishes caught in its waters are Labeobarbus aeneus, Barbus pallidus, Barbus anoplus, Myxus capensis, Anguilla marmorata  and Anguilla mossambica. Labeobarbus aeneus is an invasive species, now widely present in the river system.

See also 

 List of rivers of South Africa
List of estuaries of South Africa

References

External links 

Mbashe Key Area
South African Tourism - Mbashe River Picture
SA Birding - Cwebe and Dwesa Nature Reserves
A History of the Qwathi

Rivers of the Eastern Cape